Many historic houses in Virginia are notable sites. The U.S. state of Virginia was home to many of America's Founding Fathers, four of the first five U.S. presidents, as well as many important figures of the Confederacy. As one of the earliest locations of European settlement in America, Virginia has some of the oldest buildings in the nation.

List of historic houses in Virginia 
Listing includes date of the start of construction where known.  

 Aberdeen c. 1800
 Adam Thoroughgood House, c. 1719
 Agecroft Hall, late 15th century, Lancashire, England—English Tudor manor house transplanted to Richmond and reconstructed by Thomas C. Williams, Jr. in 1925
 The Anchorage 1749, Northumberland County
 Ampthill 1730, Richmond, Virginia, Built by Henry Cary, Jr. and was later owned by Colonel Archibald Cary.
 Arlington House (the Custis-Lee Mansion), 1802, Arlington County —- home of Robert E. Lee
 Ash Grove, 1790, Fairfax County—home of Thomas Fairfax, and Henry Fairfax
 Ash Lawn–Highland, 1799, Albemarle County—home of James Monroe
 Bacon's Castle, 1665, Surry County — only Jacobean great houses in the U.S., used as a stronghold in Bacon's Rebellion
 Ball-Sellers House (Arlington, Virginia) built in 1742 by John Ball, owned by the Arlington Historical Society.
 Bel Air Plantation, c. 1740, Prince William County — Home of Parson Weems, the first biographer of George Washington and the creator of the cherry tree story 
 Belle Air Plantation, c. 1700, Charles City County
 Bell House, 1882, Westmoreland County — summer home of Alexander Graham Bell 
 Belle Grove, 1790s, Pittsylvania County - a Federal style home owned by the Whitmell P. Tunstall family
 Belle Grove, 1790, King George County - a house in Port Conway, birthplace of James Madison
 Bellwood, c. 1800, Chesterfield County, former plantation house, now serves as the officer's club at Defense Supply Center Richmond.
 Belle Grove, 1797, Frederick County - a house in Middletown, home of Dolley Madison's sister and a National Trust Historic Site
 Belroi home, birthplace of Walter Reed, in Belroi, Virginia
 Belvoir, 1741, Fairfax County — home of Col. William Fairfax, Bryan Fairfax, Sally Fairfax
 Berkeley Plantation, 1726, Charles City County — home of the Harrison family (Benjamin Harrison V; birthplace of William Henry Harrison)
 Berry Hill Plantation, 1835, Halifax County — home of the Bruce family
 Brandon Plantation, c. 1765, Prince George County — home of the Harrison family
 Brompton, 1824, Fredericksburg, - 19th-century mansion, home of the President of the University of Mary Washington
 Brush-Everard House, 1718, Williamsburg
 Carlyle House, 1753, Alexandria - home of John Carlyle, Scottish merchant
 Carter's Grove, 1755, James City County — home of the Burwell family
 Castle Hill, 1764, Albemarle County—home of Thomas Walker (explorer) and William Cabell Rives
 Chatham Manor, 1768, Stafford County — home of William Fitzhugh
 Court Manor, c. 1812, Rockingham County - early Greek-Revival manor house, former home of Willis Sharpe Kilmer
 Dodona Manor, c. 1805, Loudoun County – home of General George C. Marshall
 Evergreen, c. 1800, Prince George County - birthplace of Edmund Ruffin
 Frascati, 1821, Orange County, - home of U.S. Supreme Court justice Philip P. Barbour 
 Ferry Plantation House c. 1830, Virginia Beach — Civil War Home of USN/CSN Cmdr. Charles Fleming McIntosh
 Foxton Cottage c. 1734, Taylorstown historic district.
 Green Spring Plantation, James City County - home of governor Sir William Berkeley site of Bacon's Rebellion, ruins 
 Greenway Plantation c. 1776, Charles City County, birthplace U.S. President John Tyler.
 The Governor's Palace, Williamsburg - home of Virginia's colonial governors, reconstruction
 Gunston Hall, 1755, Fairfax County — home of George Mason
 Hartwood Manor, 1848, Hartwood - An unusual example of Gothic Revival architecture, constructed by Julia and Ariel Foote.
 Hidden Springs, 1804, Rockingham County — home of the John Hite II
 The John Marshall House, 1790, Richmond - home of John Marshall
 Hunting Quarter, c. 1770s, Sussex County, Virginia, Home of Captain Henry Harrison (c. 1736 – 1772), son of Benjamin Harrison IV of Berkeley, brother of Benjamin Harrison V and uncle of William Henry Harrison. 
 Kenmore Plantation, 1770s, Fredericksburg — home of George Washington's sister Betty Lewis
 Kittiewan, c. 1750, Charles City County - home of Dr. William Rickman.
 Long Branch Plantation, 1811, Clarke County, home of the Nelson family
 Lowland Cottage, 1666, Gloucester County - home of Robert Bristow 
 The Manse, 1846, City of Staunton - birthplace of Woodrow Wilson
 Marlbourne, 1840, Hanover County, - home of Edmund Ruffin
 The Matthew Jones House, c. 1725, Newport News
 Maymont, 1893, Richmond - home of James H. Dooley
 Monticello, 1768, Albemarle County — home of Thomas Jefferson
 Montpelier, c. 1764, Orange County — home of James Madison and a National Trust Historic Site
 Moor Green, 1815, Prince William County - home of Howson Hooe and a National and Virginia designated historic site. 
 Morven Park, 1781, Loudoun County - home of Governor Westmorland Davis and location of the founding of Southern Planter (now Southern Living) magazine 
 Mount Vernon, 1741, Fairfax County — home of Lawrence Washington and his half-brother George Washington
 North Bend Plantation, 1819, Charles City County - family home of the Harrison family
 Oak Hill, 1822, Loudoun County — home of James Monroe after Ash Lawn-Highland
 Oatlands, 1804, Loudoun County - Plantation belonging to the Carters of Virginia, a National Trust Historic Site
 Old Mansion, c. 1669, Caroline County - home of the Hoome family
 The Peyton Randolph House, 1715, Williamsburg—home of Peyton Randolph
 Piney Grove at Southall's Plantation, c. 1790, Charles City County - home of the Southall family
 Pleasant Point, 1724-1765, Surry County, Patented in 1657 - Home of Edwards Family
 Poplar Forest, 1806, Bedford County—retreat home of Thomas Jefferson
 Red Hill, reconstruction, Charlotte County – last home and death site of Patrick Henry
 Rippon Lodge, c. 1747, Prince William County — home of the Blackburn family
 Rockledge Mansion, built in 1758 by William Buckland at Occoquan, Prince William County — home of John Ballendine, the founder of Occuquan
 Russell House and Store, early 19th-century house and store at Dale City
 Sara Myers House, 1790, Old Town District of Fredericksburg
 Selma Plantation House, 1811, Loudoun County - Leesburg
 Scotchtown, c. 1730, Hanover County — home of Patrick Henry
 Seven Springs, c. 1725, King William County — home of the Dabney family
 Sherwood Forest, c. 1720, Charles City County — home of John Tyler
 Shirley Plantation, 1723, Charles City County — home of the Carter family
 Stratford Hall Plantation, 1730, Westmoreland County — home of the Lee family (Thomas Lee; birthplace of Richard Henry Lee and Robert E. Lee)
 Smith's Fort Plantation, 1761, Surry County - home to Jacob Faulcon and his family
 Swannanoa, 1912, Augusta County - retreat home of James H. Dooley
 Thorpeland, c. 1700s, York County, built on land patented by Christopher Calthorpe in 1631.
 Tree Hill, c. 1800, Henrico County, 
 Upper Brandon, 1825, Prince George County, - home of William Byrd Harrison of the Harrison family. 
 Wakefield, Westmoreland County — birthplace of George Washington, recreation
 Westover, c. 1755, Charles City County — family home of the Byrds (William Byrd II)
 White House of the Confederacy, 1818, Richmond - Used as President Jefferson Davis's executive mansion during the Civil War
 Wilton House, 1753, Richmond — home of the Randolph family (William Randolph III)
 Wilton Plantation, 1763, Middlesex — home of the Churchill family
 Woodlawn, 1805, Fairfax County — home of George Washington's niece and nephew, and a National Trust Historic Site
 Wythe House, 1754, Williamsburg — home of George Wythe

See also
List of National Historic Landmarks in Virginia
List of Registered Historic Places in Virginia
List of the oldest buildings in Virginia

References 

Houses in Virginia
Virginia culture
Historic houses